The Short course swimming at the 2017 Asian Indoor and Martial Arts Games in Ashgabat took place from 22 to 25 September at the Ashgabat Aquatics Centre.

Medalists

Men

Women

Medal table

Results

Men

50 m freestyle
22 September

100 m freestyle
25 September

200 m freestyle
24 September

50 m backstroke
23 September

100 m backstroke
24 September

50 m breaststroke
23 September

100 m breaststroke
22 September

50 m butterfly
24 September

100 m butterfly
23 September

100 m individual medley
25 September

200 m individual medley
22 September

4 × 50 m freestyle relay
24 September

4 × 100 m freestyle relay
23 September

4 × 50 m medley relay
22 September

4 × 100 m medley relay
25 September

Women

50 m freestyle
22 September

100 m freestyle
25 September

200 m freestyle
24 September

50 m backstroke
23 September

100 m backstroke
24 September

50 m breaststroke
25 September

100 m breaststroke
22 September

50 m butterfly
24 September

100 m butterfly
23 September

100 m individual medley
25 September

200 m individual medley
22 September

4 × 50 m freestyle relay
24 September

4 × 100 m freestyle relay
23 September

4 × 50 m medley relay
22 September

4 × 100 m medley relay
25 September

References

Results book

2017 Asian Indoor and Martial Arts Games events
2017
Asian Indoor Games
Swimming in Turkmenistan